Groundberry may refer to:

 Gaultheria procumbens
 Rubus hispidus